USS Kentucky (BB-6), was the second and final  pre-dreadnought battleship built for the United States Navy in the 1890s. Designed for coastal defense, the Kearsarge-class battleships had a low freeboard and heavy armor. The ships carried an armament of four  and four  guns in an unusual two-story turret arrangement. The Newport News Shipbuilding Company of Virginia laid down her keel on 30 June 1896. She was launched on 24 March 1898 and was commissioned on 15 May 1900.

In her twenty years of service, Kentucky participated in no combat. Between 1901 and 1904, she served in East Asia, and from 1904 to 1907 she cruised the Atlantic. In 1907, she joined the Great White Fleet on its world tour, returning to the United States in 1909. She was modernized between 1909 and 1911, but did not operate again until 1915, when she sailed to the Mexican coast to participate in the American intervention in the Mexican Revolution, where she stayed until 1916. From 1917 until her decommissioning on 29 May 1920, she served as a training ship. She was sold for scrap on 24 March 1923.

Design 

[[File:USS Kentucky LOC det.4a14322.jpg|left|thumb|alt=A smaller turret on top of a bigger turret.|Kentucky'''s double turret, circa 1900–1901]]

The Kearsarge-class battleships were designed to be used for coastal defense. Kentucky was manned by 40 officers and 514 enlisted men, a total of 554 crew.Kentucky, like , had two double turrets, with two /35 caliber guns and two /40 caliber guns each, stacked on two levels. The guns and turret armor were designed by the Bureau of Ordnance, while the turret itself was designed by the Bureau of Construction and Repair. The configuration caused the guns to be mounted far back in the turret, making the ports very large. Admiral William Sims claimed that as a result of the gun mounting, a shell fired into the port could reach the magazines below, disabling the guns. In addition to these guns, Kentucky carried fourteen /40 caliber guns, twenty 6-pounder guns, eight 1-pounder guns, four  machine guns, and four  torpedo tubes. Kentucky had a very low freeboard, often making her guns unusable during bad weather.

The ship's armor was made of harveyized steel.

 Construction Kentucky was authorized on 2 March 1895. The contract for her construction was awarded on 2 January 1896, and her keel was laid down on 30 June 1896 by Newport News Shipbuilding & Dry Dock Company in Virginia. The total cost was $4,998,119.43. In preparation for the Kentuckys christening, the Navy asked Kentucky Governor William O'Connell Bradley to select a member of his family to perform the ceremony. Bradley chose his daughter, Christine, who was attending school in Washington, D.C. The Bradleys were a family of teetotalers, so Governor Bradley sent a bottle of water from Lincoln Spring in Hodgenville, Kentucky, for Christine to use during the ceremony. Kentucky was christened on 24 March 1898, the same day as her sister ship, Kearsarge. Soon after Miss Bradley broke the bottle of water over the Kentuckys bow, a delegation from the Women's Christian Temperance Union, led by Frances Beauchamp, presented the Governor's daughter with a gift of a silver tray, a water pitcher, and two goblets. The inscription read, "Kentucky Christian Temperance Union to Miss Christine Bradley, as a tribute to her loyalty to conviction in the christening of the Battleship Kentucky with water. March 10, 1898." Kentucky was commissioned on 15 May 1900, under the command of Captain Colby Mitchell Chester.

 Service history 

During the summer of 1900, Kentucky was fitted out in the New York Navy Yard. On 26 October, during the Boxer Rebellion, she left Tompkinsville, Staten Island for China, passing through Gibraltar and the Suez Canal. On 5 February 1901 she arrived at Manila, and on 23 March she replaced the protected cruiser  as the flagship of Rear Admiral Louis Kempff. Between 1901 and 1904, Kentucky visited numerous ports in China and Japan, including Chefoo, Wusong, Nanking, Taku Forts, Hong Kong, Xiamen, Nagasaki, Kobe, and Yokohama. In 1902, Kentucky became the flagship of Rear Admiral Frank Wildes, although he moved his flag to the distilling ship  on 12 April 1902. In November 1902, she became the flagship of Rear Admiral Robley D. Evans.

On 13 March 1904 she sailed from Manila, passing through the Suez Canal and the Strait of Gibraltar, and arriving at New York City on 21 May. After receiving upgrades at the New York Navy Yard, including the addition of smoke ejectors, Kentucky joined the North Atlantic Squadron. The battleship participated in the welcome of the British North Atlantic Squadron at Annapolis, Maryland, in October 1905. During the 1906 Cuban Insurrection, she carried Marines to Cuba, embarking them from Provincetown on 23 September, and landing them at Havana, Cuba, on 1 October. She remained there until 9 October, and then returned to New England. Kentucky attended the Jamestown Exposition at Norfolk, Virginia, on 15 April 1907, and then participated in exercises off the New England coast.

Great White Fleet

In 1907, the Great White Fleet was ordered by U.S. President Theodore Roosevelt to circle the world, as a demonstration of the might of the United States Navy. Kentucky was attached to the Fourth Division of the Second Squadron, and was commanded by Captain Walter C. Cowles, while the fleet as a whole was commanded by Rear Admiral Evans, Kentuckys former flag officer. On 16 December 1907, the fleet saluted the presidential yacht , and left from Hampton Roads. The fleet then sailed south, passing Trinidad and Rio de Janeiro, and going through the Straits of Magellan. From there she passed the west coast of South America, visiting Punta Arenas and Valparaíso, Chile, Callao, Peru, and Magdalena Bay, Mexico. The fleet arrived at San Diego on 14 April 1908 and continued to San Francisco on 6 May. Two months later it arrived at Honolulu, and from there sailed to Auckland, New Zealand, arriving on 9 August. On 20 August, the fleet reached Sydney, Australia, and a week later sailed for Melbourne.Kentucky departed Albany, Western Australia, on 18 September, passing through ports in the Philippine Islands, Japan, China, and Ceylon before traveling through the Suez Canal. The fleet split at Port Said on 8 January 1909, with Kentucky visiting Tripoli and Algiers before rejoining the other ships at Gibraltar. She returned to Hampton Roads on 22 February, and was inspected by President Roosevelt.

Later service

As with most of the Great White Fleet ships, Kentucky was modernized on her return. She was decommissioned at the Philadelphia Naval Shipyard on 28 August 1909, and her modernization was completed in 1911, at a cost of $675,000. The ship received cage masts, new water-tube boilers, and another four 5-inch guns. The 1-pounder guns were removed, as were sixteen of the 6-pounders. On 4 June 1912, she was recommissioned in the Second Reserve, and on 31 May 1913 she was transferred to the Atlantic Reserve Fleet in Philadelphia.

She was recommissioned again at Philadelphia on 23 June 1915. On 11 September that year, following the United States occupation of Veracruz, she sailed to Mexico, arriving at Veracruz on 28 September. She remained there during the Mexican Revolution, staying until 2 June 1916, except for a visit to New Orleans for the Mardi Gras festival in March 1916. The battleship stopped at Guantanamo Bay Naval Base and Santo Domingo on her way back to Philadelphia, arriving there on 18 June 1916. From July until September, she trained militiamen near Block Island and Boston. On 2 October Kentucky returned to New York, and entered the New York Naval Shipyard on 2 January 1917, remaining there until the United States entered World War I. She arrived at Yorktown, Virginia on 2 May, and trained recruits along the Atlantic coast, from Chesapeake Bay to Long Island Sound. During the war, she trained several thousand men, in 15 groups of recruits.Kentucky was overhauled at the Boston Navy Yard, beginning on 20 December 1918. On 18 March 1919, she left for exercises in Guantánamo Bay, Norfolk, and along the New England coast. Between 29 May and 30 August 1919, Kentucky trained United States Naval Academy midshipmen. Following World War I, the United States agreed to the Washington Naval Treaty, which was aimed at preventing a naval arms race by limiting the size of the signatories' fleets. As a result, many old and obsolete ships were scrapped, including Kentucky. Kentucky'' was decommissioned on 29 May 1920. Her name was struck from the Naval Vessel Register on 27 May 1922 and she was sold for scrap to Dravo Corporation on 24 March 1923.

Citations

Bibliography

Books

Newspapers

Journals

Online resources

Further reading

External links 

 Maritimequest USS Kentucky BB-6 Photo Gallery
 
 Naval Historical Center USS Kentucky (Battleship # 6, BB-6), 1900–1924, Selected Views 

Kearsarge-class battleships
1898 ships
World War I battleships of the United States
Ships built in Newport News, Virginia